Frederick E Rose (London) Ltd v William H Pim Junior & Co Ltd [1953] 2 QB 450 is an English contract law case concerning the rectification of contractual documents and the interpretation of contracts in English law.

Facts
Frederick E Rose (London) Ltd was asked to supply ‘up to five hundred tons of Moroccan horsebeans described here as feveroles’ to an English firm in Egypt. So, Rose asked an Algerian supplier, William H Pim Junior & Co Ltd, what feveroles were. Pim replied ‘feveroles means just horsebeans’. They contracted for the supply of ‘horsebeans’. Both believed horsebeans were feveroles. However, little did Rose know, there are three bean sizes, feves, feveroles and fevettes. Rose got feves delivered, which are larger and cheaper. The English firm had a claim for the wrong beans being delivered, and Rose in turn brought a claim against Pim. Rose sought to rectify the contract to replace ‘horsebean’ with ‘feverole’.

Judgment
Denning LJ, Singleton LJ and Morris LJ held that because both parties were agreed on horsebeans, and the contract was not void for mistake, nor could the contractual document be rectified in this instance. Denning LJ said this was not a claim for rectification because that is concerned with contracts and documents, not with intentions. In order to get rectification, it is necessary to show that the parties were in complete agreement on the terms of their contract, but by an error wrote them down wrongly. He said there might have been a case in misrepresentation or mistake but that was not pleaded and it is very different from rectification. He added that they probably should not have dropped the claim for collateral warranty that the beans would comply with a demand for feveroles.

See also

Interpreting contracts in English law
Hillas & Co Ltd v Arcos Ltd [1932] UKHL 2
Smith v Hughes (1871) LR 6 QB 597
Hartog v Colin & Shields [1939] 3 All ER 566

Notes

References
Spencer, ‘The Rule in L’Estrange v Graucob’ [1973] CLJ 104, 108

Lord Denning cases
English interpretation case law
English agreement case law
1953 in British law
Court of Appeal (England and Wales) cases
1953 in case law